Noel Malicdem (born 10 January 1977) is a Filipino darts player who plays in Professional Darts Corporation events.

Career

Malicdem qualified for the 2019 World Championship. In his first round he defeated Jeffrey de Graaf 2:3, but lost in the second round to Kyle Anderson. 
A year later he again managed to qualify for the 2020 World Championship as a qualifier from Asian Tour, where he finished on 4th place overall. In the first round of the championship, he quite easily won 3:0 over Rowby-John Rodriguez. In the second round he was leading and had match darts against Peter Wright, but in the end he wasn't able to check-out and eventually lost in sudden death leg.

In 2019 he represented the Philippines alongside Lourence Ilagan in the PDC World Cup of Darts, but they lost in the first round against England.

World Championship results

PDC
2019: Second round (lost to Kyle Anderson 1–3)
2020: Second round (lost to Peter Wright 2–3)

Performance timeline

PDC

(W) Won; (F) finalist; (SF) semifinalist; (QF) quarterfinalist; (#R) rounds 6, 5, 4, 3, 2, 1; (RR) round-robin stage; (Prel.) Preliminary round; (DNQ) Did not qualify; (DNP) Did not participate; (NH) Not held

References

External links
Profile and stats on Darts Database

Filipino darts players
1977 births
Living people
Professional Darts Corporation associate players
PDC World Cup of Darts Filipino team